Balijhor is an Indian Bengali drama television series which premiered on 6 February 2023 on Star Jalsha and also digitally available on Disney+ Hotstar. It stars Trina Saha, Koushik Roy and Indrasish Roy as the leads. This show marks the comeback of Trina Saha and Koushik Roy as couples for the second time after 8 months after getting immense popularity from Khorkuto and of Indrasish Roy after his recent project Dhulokona.

Plot 

Taking her under his wing, Somudro Sen grooms his daughter Jhora to be a politician. But his ambitions get disrupted when Jhora falls for her classmate Srot.

Cast

Main 
 Trina Saha as Jhora Banerjee (née Sen) – a dancer, Samudra and Lokkhishri's only daughter, Srot's love interest and Maharghya's one-sided lover turned wife, Animesh's daughter in-law. (2023 – present)
 Koushik Roy as Maharghya Banerjee – Samudra's assistant who lives in Jhora's house since childhood and her husband, Animesh's son (2023 – present)
 Indrasish Roy as Srot Basu – a fresher, who belongs to a middle class family, Jhora's former love interest. (2023 – present)

Recurring

Jhora's family 
 Bharat Kaul as Samudra Sen – Lokkhishri's husband, Jhora's father, Maharghya's guide turned father in-law, a minister. He wants her daughter Jhora to get married to Maharghya, but she is in love with Srot and fails to understand. (2023 – present)
 Moyna Mukherji as Lokkhishri Sen – Samudra's wife, Maharghya's mother in-law and Jhora's mother. (2023 – present)

 Madhabi Mukherjee as Samudra's mother, Lokkhishri's mother-in-law and Jhora's grandmother. (2023 – present) 
 Dulal Lahiri as Samudra's maternal uncle. (2023 – present)
 Chaitali Chakraborty as Samudra's maternal aunt. (2023 – present)

Maharghya's family 
 Unknown as Animesh Banerjee – Maharghya's father

Srot's family 
 Sabitri Chatterjee as Srot's grandmother. (2023 – present) 
Shankar Chakraborty as Srot's father. (2023 – present) 
 Rita Dutta Chakraborty as Srot's mother. (2023 – present)
Tathagata Mukherjee as Barshan Basu – Srot's elder brother and Kankana's husband. (2023 – present)
 Rajanya Mitra as Kankana Basu aka Bousona – Srot's elder sister-in-law and Barshan's wife (2023 – present)
Bhaskar Banerjee as Srot's younger paternal uncle (2023 – present)
Anushree Das as Srot's younger paternal aunt (2023 – present)
Priyanka Mitra as Doel Basu – Srot's younger cousin sister (2023 – present)
Sonal Mishra as Koel Basu – Srot's youngest cousin sister (2023 – present)
 Ambarish Bhattacharya as Kakababu – Srot's youngest paternal uncle and a typical strict Bengali man (2023 – present)

Others 
 Debalina Banerjee as Rupashi – the care-taker of the Sen residence (2023)
 Prity Biswas as Poly – Samudra's helper who secretly loves him and Lokkhishri's rival. (2023 – present)

Reception
The show was initially expected to create a high competition against competitor-show Mithai which airs on Zee Bangla. However, it managed to only open with an average mark of 4.5 TVR in the premier week.

References 

Star Jalsha original programming
2023 Indian television series debuts
Bengali-language television programming in India

External links 

 Balijhor at Disney+ Hotstar